Bastiaan Johan "Bas" Heijne (born 9 January 1960) is a Dutch writer and translator.

Early life and education 
Bastiaan Johan Heijne was born in Nijmegen in the Netherlands on 9 January 1960. He studied English language and literature at the University of Amsterdam.

Career 
Heijne published in De Tijd, NRC Handelsblad, HP, De Groene Amsterdammer, and Vrij Nederland. Since 1991, he works for NRC Handelsblad. He translated works by E.M. Forster and Evelyn Waugh. Heijne gave the 2005 Mosse Lecture, titled De eeuwige homo (The eternal gay).

Heijne was awarded the Henriette Roland Holst Prize (named after the Dutch poet Henriette Roland Holst) for the book Hollandse toestanden ("Dutch affairs") (2005), a collection of his columns from NRC Handelsblad. In 2014, he won the J. Greshoff Prize (named after the Dutch journalist, poet and literary critic Jan Greshoff) for his essay Angst en schoonheid ("Fear and beauty"), on the Dutch writer Louis Couperus. In 2017, he has received the P. C. Hooft Award for his non-fiction oeuvre.

Bibliography 
 (1983) Laatste woorden (Last words)
 (1987) Vreemde reis (Strange journey)
 (1989) Heilige monsters (Holy monsters)
 (1992) Suez
 (1994) Vlees en bloed (Flesh and blood)
 (1996) Het gezicht van Louis Couperus (The face of Louis Couperus)
 (1999) De mens is zo'n breekbaar wezen (Man is such a fragile creature)
 (2000) De wijde wereld (The wide world)
 (2003) Van Gogh
 (2003) Het verloren land (The lost country)
 (2004) Tafelgesprekken (Table conversations)
 (2004) De werkelijkheid (The reality)
 (2005) Hollandse toestanden (Dutch affairs)
 (2006) Zang (Singing)
 (2006) Grote vragen (Big questions)
 (2007) Onredelijkheid (Unreasonableness)
 (2010) Harde liefde (Tough love)
 (2011) Moeten wij van elkaar houden? (Do we have to love one another?)
 (2011) Echt zien (Really seeing)
 (2013) Angst en schoonheid (Fear and beauty)
 (2016) Onbehagen (Discontent)
 (2017) Staat van Nederland, een pleidooi (State of the Netherlands, a plea)

References 

1960 births
20th-century Dutch novelists
20th-century Dutch male writers
20th-century essayists
20th-century Dutch short story writers
21st-century Dutch novelists
21st-century essayists
21st-century Dutch short story writers
Dutch columnists
Dutch essayists
Dutch male short story writers
Dutch translators
Living people
Male essayists
Dutch male novelists
P. C. Hooft Award winners
People from Nijmegen
21st-century Dutch male writers